Blyth Academy is a Canadian private education company founded in 1977 by Sam Blyth and is now part of the Globeducate network. Based in Toronto, Ontario, Blyth Academy is a chain of private secondary schools and academic credit programs in Canada and abroad. Primarily located throughout Ontario, Blyth Academy also has schools in the United States, Florence (Italy) and Qatar, in addition to an online program and study-abroad programs that offer academic credit. In 2018, Blyth Academy founder Sam Blyth sold the organization.

Background 
Blyth Academy is a private company based in Toronto, Ontario, that runs a chain of private secondary schools with campuses throughout Ontario. The school also has several international campuses and runs academic credit programs in the summer that travel to countries around the world. Founded in 1977 by Sam Blyth, Blyth Academy describes its schools as experiential learning programs with small class sizes. Blyth Academy has fourteen campuses throughout the province of Ontario. A U.S. campus opened in 2015 in Washington, D.C., and a Qatar campus opened in 2016. Blyth also offers an online program and study abroad options for academic credit. The Blyth Cambridge Commonwealth Trust Scholarship is an annual undergraduate scholarship awarded to Canadian high school graduates to attend Cambridge University in England.

Blyth Academy

Ontario campuses 
Blyth Academy is a private, co-ed, preparatory school for intermediate and secondary education that provides full-time, night school, summer school, and private courses for students in grades 4-12 (dependent on campus). The academy has seven campuses in Ontario: Mississauga, Etobicoke, Downsview Park, Lawrence Park, Burlington, Ottawa, and Whitby. The academy operates on a four-term academic year, in which students take two courses per term with three two-hour periods per day. Class sizes are typically small; an average of ten students.

Educational partners include the Art Gallery of Ontario, Royal Ontario Museum, Gardiner Museum, Toronto International Film Festival, Outward Bound Canada, and Don Valley Brick Works.

Scholarships and bursaries are available for full-time students who are in need of financial aid.

Online Programs 
In 2014, Blyth Academy launched an asynchronous online program called Blyth Academy Online. The online programs offers 160 Ontario Secondary School Diploma courses. Students can enrol in a full course load or take a single course to earn single credits at a time.  

In 2020, Blyth Academy launched a synchronous, teacher-led virtual school called Blyth Academy Orbit. Blyth Academy Orbit provides full-time, part-time, night school, summer school and private courses for students in grades 7-12. Virtual classes are offered on the same schedule as in-person learning options. Classes sizes are typically small; an average of ten students.

Blyth Academy Qatar 
In September 2016, Blyth Academy opened its first campus in Qatar. The school received complete and formal accreditation from Alberta Education of Canada in January 2015 and formal accreditation from the Qatar Ministry of Education in March 2016. The school was established with approval from Her Highness' Office for the School Board, School, and the adoption of the Canadian curriculum to be funded by the State of Qatar.

Templeton Academy DC (Washington, D.C.) 
Templeton Academy DC, formally known as Blyth-Templeton Academy, is a private, co-ed, experiential learning high school in Washington, D.C. serving grades 9–12. Founded in 2015, it is the first Blyth Academy program in the United States.

Blyth Academy partnered with Templeton Learning to bring the Blyth private school model to the United States. Templeton Learning, LLC. invests in educational programs for students in grades K-12, currently Templeton Academy DC in Washington, D.C. and WonderLab based in Austin, Texas.  It was co-founded by the Keller family, who also co-founded Keller Graduate School of Management (now part of Devry University) in 1973.

Blyth Academy Florence (Italy) 
Blyth Academy Florence is a private, co-ed, experiential learning high school in Florence, Italy serving grades 9–12. Founded in 2017, it is the first Blyth Academy in Europe. In 2018, the school was renamed the Canadian School of Florence

Study abroad

Summer programs 
Blyth Academy International Summers gives high school students the chance to study abroad earning accredited high school courses during the summer. Programs are structured to include program managers, teachers and support staff. On-site learning is encouraged on all international programs. Blyth Academy International Summers offers over 20 different programs, to over 30 countries on six continents:

 Grand Tour Europe East
 Grand Tour Europe West
 Scotland, England & Ireland
 Ireland & England
 Italy
 Rome & the Greek Islands
 Grand Tour Asia
 Japan
 Florence
 Australia, New Zealand & Fiji
 Hawaii
 Nicaragua
 Costa Rica
 Cozumel
 Amazon & the Galápagos Islands
 France
 Greece
 Spain

Needs-based scholarships provide partial to full funding. The International Summers program was paused in 2020 and was re-introduced in July 2023.

Global High School 
Through Blyth Academy Global High School, Grade 11 and 12 students travel around the world, studying and earning high school credits. Students can enrol for as little as a ten-week term or for the full four terms of their academic year.

 Term 1: Europe (Oxford, London, Barcelona, Rome, Florence, Crete, Athens)
 Term 2: Asia (Beijing, Siem Reap, Luang Prabang, Chiang Rai, Ko Lanta, Ayuttaya)
 Term 3: Australia & New Zealand (Sydney, Whitsunday Coast, Brisbane, Queenstown, Rotorua, Auckland)
 Term 4: Central & South America (León, Granada, Ometepe Island, San Juan del Sur, Monteverde, Arenal, Guanacaste Coast, Lima, Machu Picchu, Cusco)

Students earn two credits per term. The Global High School program was paused in 2020.

Cambridge Scholars 
The Blyth Cambridge Commonwealth Trust Scholarships are offered annually to Canadian high school graduates who wish to take their undergraduate degree at Cambridge University in England. The successful candidates will be granted admission to the college of their choice at Cambridge University, full tuition for three years of undergraduate study, travel costs and a full living allowance.

The awards are also open to current Canadian undergraduates wishing to pursue an undergraduate degree at Cambridge University.

The scholarships are awarded to students who for financial reasons would not otherwise be able to attend the university. Students who do have financial means are still encouraged to apply to the university and College of their choice and good candidates will be invited to interview in Toronto in late November/early December.

Class Action Lawsuit

A number of former faculty members have commenced a $20 million claim class action lawsuit against Blyth Academy alleging that they were misclassified as independent contractors rather than employees. The plaintiffs have brought a motion in court to have the class action certified.

Notable Blyth Academy alumni 
 Aaron Ekblad, professional hockey player with the Florida Panthers in the National Hockey League - Blyth Academy Barrie
 Mitch Marner, hockey player with the Toronto Maple Leafs in the National Hockey League - Blyth Academy London
 Alexander Nylander, professional hockey player with the Buffalo Sabres in the National Hockey League
 Owen Tippett, professional hockey player with the Philadelphia Flyers in the National Hockey League
 Penny Oleksiak, Canadian competitive swimmer and Canada's most decorated Olympian.

References

External links 

Private schools in Toronto
Private schools in Ottawa
Education companies of Canada
Companies based in Toronto
Private schools in Ontario
Canadian international schools
International schools in Toronto
Educational programs
Student travel
Study abroad programs
International educational organizations